The 2005 CAA men's basketball tournament was held from March 4–7, 2005 at the Richmond Coliseum in Richmond, Virginia. The winner of the tournament was Old Dominion, who received an automatic bid to the 2005 NCAA Men's Division I Basketball Tournament.

Bracket

Honors

References

-2005 CAA men's basketball tournament
Colonial Athletic Association men's basketball tournament
CAA men's basketball tournament
CAA men's basketball tournament
Sports competitions in Virginia
Basketball in Virginia